Keying (愛新覺羅 耆英, 21 March 1787 – 29 June 1858), also known by his romanized Mandarin Chinese name Qiying or Ch'i-ying (Wade–Giles) and his Manchu name Kiyeng, was a Manchu statesman during the Qing dynasty of China. An imperial clansman of the house of Aisin Gioro, he began his career in the Imperial Clan Court. He conducted several peace treaties with Western powers, beginning with the Treaty of Nanking, which ended the First Opium War with Britain in 1842.  Keying was sent to negotiate again in 1858 to settle the Arrow War with Britain and France, but the settlement was repudiated by the Xianfeng Emperor and he was forced to commit suicide.

Early career 
Keying was born on 21 March 1787. A descendant of Nurhaci's ninth son Babutai (Duke Kexi of the First Rank), Keying was a member of the imperial house of Aisin Gioro, and belonged to the Manchu Plain Blue Banner in the Eight Banners. He held several prominent posts in the Qing government and was demoted several times because of corruption in office, but managed to regain his position as a leading official in the Qing court.

Opium Wars 

In 1842, the Daoguang Emperor entrusted Keying to conclude a peace treaty with the Britain following the First Opium War, and he was chiefly responsible for negotiating and signing the Treaty of Nanking. The following year, he signed the Treaty of the Bogue to supplement the Treaty of Nanking. He also concluded the Treaty of Wanghia (1844) with the United States, the Treaty of Whampoa (1844) with France, and the Treaty of Canton (1847) with Sweden-Norway. This is the first group of what the Chinese later called the unequal treaties. In November 1845, Keying was well received in Hong Kong.

In 1858, the Xianfeng Emperor ordered Keying to negotiate a peace treaty with Britain and France to conclude the Second Opium War. During the negotiations, the British interpreters Horatio Nelson Lay and Thomas Francis Wade sought to expose Keying's duplicity by producing documents the British had captured in Guangzhou, in which Keying expressed his contempt for the British. Humiliated, Keying promptly left the negotiations in Tianjin for Beijing and he was later arrested for having left his post in contravention of imperial order. He was sentenced to death by the Imperial Clan Court, but was allowed to commit suicide instead.

Namesakes 
Keying, trading junk and the first Chinese ship to sail to Britain and America.
Keying and Marine House c. 1845, became part of the Hong Kong Hotel in 1866. It was demolished in 1858 and now site of Central Building at Pedder Street and Queen's Road Central.

Notes

References 
 

 

|-

1787 births
1858 deaths
Forced suicides of Chinese people
Manchu politicians
Political office-holders in Guangdong
Political office-holders in Jiangsu
Qing dynasty diplomats
Qing dynasty politicians from Beijing
Grand Secretaries of the Qing dynasty
Assistant Grand Secretaries
Viceroys of Liangjiang
Viceroys of Liangguang
Manchu Plain Blue Bannermen